The Lola T160, and its evolution, the Lola T165, is a series of purpose-built Group 7 sports prototype race cars, designed and developed by British chassis manufacturer Lola Cars, specifically to compete in the Can-Am series in 1968. It was the successor to the competitive T70, sharing similar design knowledge and cues. Lola built the chassis, constructed out of fiberglass, and molded into an aluminum monocoque. This meant the car was light was lightweight, weighing only . This made the cars very fast, with a notably excellent power-to-weight ratio. It was used in active competition until 1971, and was succeeded and used alongside the new T220 in 1970.

References

Sports prototypes
T160
Can-Am cars